Andrea Lynn Hertzfeld (born July 27, 1979) is an associate judge of the Superior Court of the District of Columbia.

Education and career 
Hertzfeld earned her Bachelor of Arts from Bowling Green State University and  her Juris Doctor from Harvard Law School.

She worked in the U.S. Attorney's Office in the District of Columbia later became an assistant United States attorney.

D.C. Superior Court 
President Donald Trump nominated Hertzfeld on May 6, 2019, to a 15-year term as an associate judge on the Superior Court of the District of Columbia. She was nominated to the seat on the vacated by Stuart Gordon Nash. On October 22, 2019, the Senate Committee on Homeland Security and Governmental Affairs held a hearing on her nomination. The Senate confirmed her nomination on November 21, 2019, by voice vote.

References

1979 births
Living people
21st-century American judges
21st-century American women judges
Bowling Green State University alumni
Harvard Law School alumni
Judges of the Superior Court of the District of Columbia
People from Waterville, Ohio